This is a list of French television related events from 2016.

Events
3 May - Patrick Rouiller wins the twelfth series of Nouvelle Star. 
14 May - Slimane Nebchi wins the fifth series of The Voice: la plus belle voix.
1 September - The television version of franceinfo: launches.

Debuts

Television shows

1940s
Le Jour du Seigneur (1949–present)

1950s

Présence protestante (1955-)

2000s
Nouvelle Star (2003–2010, 2012–present)
Plus belle la vie (2004–present)
La France a un incroyable talent (2006–present)
Secret Story (2007–present)

2010s
Danse avec les stars (2011–present)
The Voice: la plus belle voix (2012–present)

Ending this year
30 millions d'amis (1976-2016)

Births

Deaths

See also
2016 in France

References

 
2016 in France
French television-related lists